Henning Warloe,(born 24 March 1961 in Bergen, Norway) is a Norwegian politician for the Conservative Party of Norway, last known as Bergen's Commissioner for Urban Development, Climate and Environmental Affairs from 2014 to 2015.

Career 
He graduated as an officer in the Norwegian Army, and holds a degree in economics from Norwegian School of Economics from 1986. Aside from his political career, Henning Warloe worked as a salesman for Strømsnes Tekniske AS 1980–1981, Director of Finance for Oskar Pedersen AS 1986–1988, Manager for  Kløverhuset shopping center 1988–1993, Manager of Sommer Bergen AS 1993–1995 and Chairman of Pepper AS 1995–2003. He was one of the founders of  Ferieklubben in Bergen. One of Henning Warloe`s hobbies is magic, and he was President of  Magiske Cirkel Norge (The Magic Circle of Norway),  a national organization for magicians, from 2008 until 2010.

Warloe was a member of Bergen City Council 1995–2003 and the leader of European Movement International in Hordaland County 1996–2001. During 2003–2007 he was Commissioner for Finance, Property Management and Business Development in the Municipality of Bergen. He was also a member of the board of the Bergen Conservative Party 2003–2009 and 1st Deputy Chairman for Hordaland Conservative Party. From 2007, Warloe was Commissioner for Culture, Sports and Business Development and from spring 2009, after the Progress Party withdrew from the City Government, he was also Acting Commissioner for Finance, Competition and Development. From 2 June until 31 January 2007, during Monica Mæland`s. maternity leave, Warloe was Acting Leader of the City Government. Warloe stepped down in the autumn of 2009, as he was elected MP for Hordaland county in the 2009 election.

In 2013, Warloe was fined and got a suspended sentence for possession and use of narcotics.  Before he was sentenced he resigned from his political duties for the Conservative Party.

References

External links
 

1961 births
Living people
Conservative Party (Norway) politicians
Politicians from Bergen
Members of the Storting
21st-century Norwegian politicians
Norwegian magicians